The Institute of mechanics and engineering, also known as the I2M, is a French institute of research located in Bordeaux, more precisely in the science Campus of Talence, Pessac and Gradignan. It is under the authority of University of Bordeaux, CNRS / INSIS, Arts et Métiers ParisTech, Bordeaux INP and INRA. It is in addition part of the Carnot Institute ARTS and currently employs more than 300 persons. It was created in 2011 from the merge of 3 "Unités Mixtes de Recherche" CNRS/University laboratories: LMP, TREFLE, US2B and 3 "Equipes d'Accueil" of Research Ministry: LAMEFIP, LGM2B, GHYMAC.
The I2M is also part of the IdEX Bordeaux (LabEX AMADEUS, CPU, EquipEx XYLOFOREST) and of the interregional cluster AEROSPACE VALLEY Aerospace Valley.

Teaching and research topics 

The main part of the research is focused on the following lines :
Nondestructive testing, composite material, process engineering
Civil engineering and energy

Research teams 

The laboratory is divided in six research teams, which have their own field of research :

DUMAS (durability of materials, systems and structures)
APY (acoustics and physics)
TREFLE (Fluid dynamics, energy)
IMC (mechanical engineering and design)
MPI (material sciences and process engineering)
GCE (civil engineering and environment)

2 cross-disciplinary teams also exist and cover the fields of nondestructive testing and wood engineering.

Projects 

Since its creation, the institute plays an important role in the project "H2E" (Horizon Hydrogen energie). Its work is mainly focused on two fields : multi-scale characterization and development of a new kind of mechanical test.
As a member of the association Fondaterra, the I2M is also in charge of a massive geological studies program in order to certify the occupation of lands.

Facilities and equipment 

High-tech apparatus are available in the institute especially in the fields of optics and numerical computations :

Scanning transmission electron microscope (STEM)
Supercomputer with 400 processors
Femto-seconds laser

Locations 

 University of Bordeaux (Talence, Gradignan, Carreire)
 Bordeaux INP (Pessac)
 Bordeaux campus of Arts et Métiers (Talence)

References and notes 

Laboratories of Arts et Métiers ParisTech
Laboratories in France
French National Centre for Scientific Research